WAVD (97.1 FM) is a radio station broadcasting a classic hits format. Licensed to Ocean Pines, Maryland, United States, the station serves Ocean City, Maryland. The station is currently owned by Forever Media.

WQJZ featured Jones Radio Networks' Smooth Jazz programming until that feed was discontinued on September 30, 2008, as a consequence of Jones having been purchased by Triton Media Group, which also operates the Dial Global stable of 24-hour music formats.  Like other former Jones affiliates, WQJZ aired programming from the Broadcast Architecture Network's smooth/urban AC format.

On April 8, 2011, WQJZ changed their format to classic hits, branded as "97.1 The Wave". On April 19, 2011, WQJZ changed their call letters to WAVD to go with "The Wave" branding.

Previous logo

External links

AVD
Classic hits radio stations in the United States
Radio stations established in 1991
1991 establishments in Maryland